This article lists the squads for the 2016 Algarve Cup, the 23rd edition of the Algarve Cup. The cup consisted of a series of friendly games, and was held in the Algarve region of Portugal from 2 to 9 March 2016. The eight national teams involved in the tournament registered a squad of 23 players.

The age listed for each player is as of 2 March 2016, the first day of the tournament. The numbers of caps and goals listed for each player do not include any matches played after the start of tournament. The club listed is the club for which the player last played a competitive match prior to the tournament. The nationality for each club reflects the national association (not the league) to which the club is affiliated. A flag is included for coaches that are of a different nationality than their own national team.

Group A

Belgium
Belgium announced their squad on 21 February 2016.

Head coach: Ives Serneels

Canada
Canada announced their squad on 27 February 2016.

Head coach:  John Herdman

Denmark
Denmark announced their squad on 9 February 2016.

Head coach: Nils Nielsen

Iceland
Iceland announced their squad on 23 February 2016.

Head coach: Freyr Alexandersson

Group B

Brazil
Brazil announced their squad on 22 February 2016.

Head coach: Vadão

New Zealand
New Zealand announced their squad on 12 February 2016.

Head coach:  Tony Readings

Portugal
Portugal announced their squad on 22 February 2016.

Head coach: Francisco Neto

Russia
Russia announced their squad on 21 February 2016.

Head coach: Elena Fomina

Player representation

By club
Clubs with 5 or more players represented are listed.

By club nationality

By club federation

By representatives of domestic league

References

2016 squads
squad